Khénifra is a province in the Moroccan region of Béni Mellal-Khénifra.  was 511,538.

The major cities and towns are: 
 Aguelmous
 Aït Ishaq
 Amalou Ighriben
 El Kbab
 Had Bouhssoussen
 Kehf Nsour
 Kerrouchen
 Khenifra
 Moulay Bouazza
 M'Rirt
 Tighassaline
 Tighza

Subdivisions
The province is divided administratively into the following:

References

 
Khénifra Province